Plutella is a genus of  moths in the family Plutellidae.

Species

Plutella acrodelta  Meyrick, 1931
Plutella albidorsella  Walsingham, 1881
Plutella antiphona Meyrick, 1901
Plutella armoraciae  Busck, 1912
Plutella australiana Landry & Hebert, 2013
Plutella capparidis  Swezey, 1920
Plutella culminata  Meyrick, 1931
Plutella deltodoma  Meyrick, 1931
Plutella diluta  Meyrick, 1931
Plutella geniatella  Zeller, 1839
Plutella haasi  Staudinger, 1883
Plutella hyperboreella  Strand, 1902
Plutella kahakaha Sattler & Robinson, 2001
Plutella mariae  Rebel, 1823
Plutella nephelaegis  Meyrick, 1931
Plutella noholio Sattler & Robinson, 2001
Plutella notabilis  Busck, 1904
Plutella omissa  Walsingham, 1889
Plutella polaris  Zeller, 1880
Plutella porrectella  (Linnaeus, 1758)
Plutella psammochroa  Meyrick, 1885
Plutella rectivittella  Zeller, 1877
Plutella xylostella  (Linnaeus, 1758)

References

External links
 

Plutellidae
Moth genera
Taxa named by Franz von Paula Schrank